Events in the year 1880 in Brazil.

Incumbents
Monarch – Pedro II
Prime Minister – Viscount of Sinimbu (until 28 March), José Antônio Saraiva (starting March 28)

Events

Births

Deaths

References

 
1880s in Brazil
Years of the 19th century in Brazil
Brazil
Brazil